Giguère or Giguere is a surname. Notable people with the surname include:

 Daniel Giguère (born 1957), Canadian politician
 Élizabeth Giguère (born 1997), Canadian ice hockey player
 François Giguère (born 1963), Canadian former general manager of the Colorado Avalanche
 Jean-Sébastien Giguère (born 1977), Canadian hockey goaltender
 Louis Giguère (1911–2002), Canadian senator
 Nathalie Giguère (born 1973), Canadian swimmer
 Paul-Antoine Giguère (1910–1987), Canadian academic and chemist
 Réal Giguère (born 1933), Canadian talk and game show host
 Robert Giguère (1616–1709) early pioneer in New France
 Samuel Giguère (born 1985), Canadian football player